Harmanköy is a village in the İnhisar District, Bilecik Province, Turkey. Its population is 201 (2021). There is a shop and a school which was closed in 2008. Nowadays, that place is used for weddings.

See also
 Harmankaya Canyon Nature Park

References

Villages in İnhisar District